Testimony is the twentieth studio album by American singer Gloria Gaynor. The album was released on June 7, 2019, by Gaither Music Group. It won the Grammy Award for Best Roots Gospel Album at the 62nd Annual Grammy Awards. The song "Talkin' 'Bout Jesus" was also nominated for the Grammy Award for Best Gospel Performance/Song.

Track listing

Charts

References

2019 albums
Gloria Gaynor albums
Gospel albums by American artists